Julie Walking Home is a 2002 drama film directed by Agnieszka Holland. It stars Miranda Otto and William Fichtner. It won an award at the 2003 Method Fest.

Plot
Julie finds her husband Henry in bed with another woman when she returns home early from a trip with their twins, Nicholas and Nicole, who believe in magic and even have their own language. When she discovers that her son has lung cancer, Julie seeks help from a faith healer in Poland. A romantic relationship develops between Julie and Alexei, the charismatic healer. After Nicholas is cured, Alexei seeks out Julie in Canada and they begin a relationship. Nicholas gets sick again and Alexei is unable to cure him. By choosing love, Alexei has lost his gift. Although Julie is now pregnant by Alexei, she and her husband reunite, both resigned to their son's illness and trying to make the best out of the situation for their daughter's sake. In the twins' magical world, death is certainly not the end, we find out in the last scene

Cast
Miranda Otto as Julie Makowsky
William Fichtner as Henry
Lothaire Bluteau as Alexei
Ryan Smith as Nicholas
Bianca Crudo as Nicole
Mark Day as Priest Harper

References

External links

2002 films
2002 drama films
English-language Canadian films
English-language German films
English-language Polish films
Films directed by Agnieszka Holland
Films set in Canada
Films set in Poland
2000s English-language films
2000s German films
Films about faith healing